University Grants Commission (UGC) is a statutory body set up by the Department of Higher Education, Ministry of Education,
Government of India in accordance to the UGC Act 1956 and is charged with coordination, determination and maintenance of standards of higher education in India. It provides recognition to universities in India, and disbursements of funds to such recognized universities and colleges. The headquarters are in New Delhi, and it has six regional centres in Pune, Bhopal, Kolkata, Hyderabad, Guwahati and Bangalore. A proposal to replace it with another new regulatory body called HECI is under consideration by the Government of India. The UGC provides doctoral scholarships to all those who clear JRF in the National Eligibility Test. On an average, each year  is spent on doctoral and post-doctoral fellowships by the commission.

History
The UGC was first formed in 1945 to oversee the work of the three Central Universities of Aligarh, Banaras and Delhi. Its responsibility was extended in 1947 to cover all Indian universities.

In August 1949 a recommendation was made to reconstitute the UGC along similar lines to the University Grants Committee of the United Kingdom. This recommendation was made by the University Education Commission of 1948–1949 which was set up under the chairmanship of S. Radhakrishnan "to report on Indian university education and suggest improvements and extensions". In 1952 the government decided that all grants to universities and higher learning institutions should be handled by the UGC. Subsequently, an inauguration was held on 28 December 1953 by Maulana Abul Kalam Azad, the Minister of Education, Natural Resources and Scientific Research.
The University Grants Commission (UGC) came into existence on 28th December, 1953 and became a statutory Organization of the Government of India by an Act of Parliament in 1956, for the coordination,determination and maintenance of standards of teaching, examination and research in university education.

In November 1956 the UGC became a statutory body upon the passing of the "University Grants Commission Act, 1956" by the Indian Parliament.

In 1994 and 1995 the UGC decentralised its operations by setting up six regional centres at Pune, Hyderabad, Kolkata, Bhopal, Guwahati and Bangalore. The head office of the UGC is located at Bahadur Shah Zafar Marg in New Delhi, with two additional bureaus operating from 35, Feroze Shah Road and the South Campus of University of Delhi as well.

In December 2015 the Indian government set a National Institutional of Ranking Framework under UGC which will rank all educational institutes by April 2016.

In February 2022 M Jagadesh Kumar was appointed as the chairman of the UGC,a professor in the Department of Electrical Engineering at IIT Delhi and former VC of JNU.

Types of universities
The types of universities regulated by the UGC include:
 Central universities, or Union universities, are established by an act of parliament and are under the purview of the Department of Higher Education in the Ministry of Education. , The list of central universities published by the UGC includes 55 central universities.
 State universities are run by the state government of each of the states and territories of India and are usually established by a local legislative assembly act. , the UGC lists 456 state universities. The oldest establishment date listed by the UGC is 1857, shared by the University of Mumbai, the University of Madras and the University of Calcutta. Most State Universities are affiliating universities in that they administer many affiliated colleges (many located in very small towns) that typically offer a range of undergraduate courses, but may also offer post-graduate courses. More established colleges may even offer PhD programs in some departments with the approval of the affiliating university. 
 Deemed university, or "Deemed to be University", is a status of autonomy granted by the Department of Higher Education on the advice of the UGC, under Section 3 of the UGC Act. , the UGC lists 50 Institutions as Deemed to be Universities included under Section 12(B) of the UGC Act, 1956. According to this list, the first institute to be granted deemed university status was Indian Institute of Science, which was granted this status on 12 May 1958. In many cases, the same listing by the UGC covers several institutes. For example, the listing for Homi Bhabha National Institute covers the Institute of Mathematical Sciences, the Indira Gandhi Centre for Atomic Research and other institutes.
 Private universities are approved by the UGC. They can grant degrees but they are not allowed to have off-campus affiliated colleges. , the UGC list of private universities lists 421 universities.

, The University Grants Commission (UGC) has also released the list of 21 fake universities operating in India. UGC has said that these 21 self-styled, unrecognized institutions functioning in contravention of the UGC Act have been declared as fake and are not entitled to confer any degree.

Professional councils
UGC, along with CSIR currently conducts NET for appointments of teachers in colleges and universities. It has made NET qualification mandatory for teaching at graduation level and at post-graduation level since July 2009. However, those with PhD are given five percent relaxation.

Accreditation for higher learning over universities under the aegis of University Grants Commission is overseen by following fifteen autonomous statutory institutions:

 All India Council for Technical Education (AICTE)
 Indian Council of Agricultural Research (ICAR)
 Bar Council of India (BCI)
 National Council for Teacher Education (NCTE)
 Rehabilitation Council of India (RCI)
 National Medical Commission (NMC)
 Pharmacy Council of India (PCI)
 Indian Nursing Council (INC)
 Dental Council of India (DCI)
 National Commission for Homoeopathy (NCH)
 National Commission for Indian System of Medicine (NCISM)
 National Council for Rural Institutes (NCRI)
 Council of Architecture
 Various State Councils of Higher Education (SCHE)

Future

In 2009, the Union Minister of Human Resource Development, Kapil Sibal made known the government of India's plans to consider the closing down of the UGC and the related body All India Council for Technical Education (AICTE), in favour of a higher regulatory body with more sweeping powers. This goal, proposed by the Higher Education and Research (HE&R) Bill, 2011, intends to replace the UGC with a National Commission for Higher Education & Research (NCHER) "for determination, coordination, maintenance and continued enhancement of standards of higher education and research". The bill proposes absorbing the UGC and other academic agencies into this new organisation. Those agencies involved in medicine and law would be exempt from this merger "to set minimum standards for medical and legal education leading to professional practice". The bill has received opposition from the local governments of the Indian states of Bihar, Kerala, Punjab, Tamil Nadu and West Bengal, but has received general support.

On 27 June 2018, the Ministry of Human Resource Development announced its plans to repeal the UGC Act, 1956. A bill was expected to be introduced in the 2018 monsoon session of the Parliament, which if passed would have led to the dissolution of the UGC. The bill also stipulated formation of a new body, the Higher Education Commission of India (HECI). This form of the bill was ultimately dropped in the face of strong political opposition, and was reworked in 2019 in order to gain political consensus. As of mid-2020 the UGC continues to remain in existence. Ministry of Human Resource Development, MHRD, was renamed as 'Ministry of Education'.

On 13 April 2022 The University Grants Commission of India (UGC India) announced to allow the students to complete two academic programmes simultaneously keeping in view the proposals outlined in the National Education Policy - NEP 2020 which emphasizes the need to enable multiple pathways to learning involving both formal and non-formal education modes.

In a joint notification with All India Council for Technical Education (AICTE), University Grants Commission advised Indian nationals & overseas citizens of India against pursuing higher education in Pakistan stating that any such student with a degree from an educational institution in Pakistan “shall not be eligible for seeking employment or higher studies in India”.The notification also stated that this will not be applicable to migrants who have been granted Indian citizenship and have obtained security clearance from MHA.

See also
List of autonomous higher education institutes in India
List of universities in India

References

External links
 UGC official website

Higher education in India
Organisations based in Delhi
1956 establishments in India
Government agencies established in 1956
Ministry of Education (India)
Indian commissions and inquiries
Higher education authorities
Regulatory agencies of India